The 2011 season was Chelsea's second season in the FA WSL.

FA WSL

Pld = Matches played; W = Matches won; D = Matches drawn; L = Matches lost; GF = Goals for; GA = Goals against; GD = Goal difference; Pts = Points

Results summary

Pld = Matches played; W = Matches won; D = Matches drawn; L = Matches lost; GF = Goals for; GA = Goals against; GD = Goal difference; Pts = Points

FA Women's Cup

Chelsea entered the competition in the fifth round as an FA WSL team. They were knocked out of the competition after being defeated 1–0 to The Belles.

FA WSL Continental Cup

Chelsea were drawn with Everton in the quarter finals and lost the game with a huge score of 4–0.

Squad statistics

Statistics accurate as of match played 4 September 2011	.

References

English football clubs 2011–12 season
2011
2010–11 in English women's football
2011–12 in English women's football